WSFL may refer to:

Web Services Flow Language, an XML language proposed by IBM to describe the composition of Web services
WSFL-TV, a television station (channel 27, virtual channel 39) licensed to Miami, Florida, United States
WSFL-FM, a radio station (106.5 FM) licensed to New Bern, North Carolina, United States
Western States Football League
Windows Subsystem for Linux
Women's Spring Football League